Missler is an unincorporated community in Meade County, Kansas, United States.

History
Missler was originally called Jasper, and under the latter name was laid out and platted in May 1888.

A post office in Jasper, established in April 1888, was renamed Missler in 1912, and remained in operation until it closed in 1933.

References

Further reading

External links
 Meade County maps: Current, Historic, KDOT

Populated places in Meade County, Kansas